Ryder Ripps (born July 7, 1986) is an American conceptual artist, programmer, and creative director.

Early life and education 
Born in New York City to a Jewish family, Ryder Ripps is a son of artist Rodney Ripps and designer Helene Verin. His parents divorced when he was nine years old. After discovering the Internet at the age of 10, he learned HTML and later JavaScript. He attended City-As-School High School and subsequently studied at The New School from 2004 to 2008, graduating with a degree in media studies. He has a younger brother, Ezra, who is also a programmer.

Career

Commercial work 
Ripps is the creative director of OKFocus, a digital marketing and design agency and has developed content for a number of contemporary musicians, fashion lines, and corporate brands like Nike and Red Bull.

Ripps has created several websites, including Internet Archeology, Dump.fm, and VFiles. In 2013, Ripps created the branding for Soylent, an open source meal replacement drink. In 2015, he co-produced two songs on Miley Cyrus & Her Dead Petz. From 2014 to 2018, Ripps worked with Kanye West and he was briefly part of West's company Donda.

Since 2019, Ripps has directed a number of music videos, and contributed photographs and designs to album artwork and advertising campaigns for Grimes (Miss Anthropocene), James Blake, and Travis Scott. Ripps acted as a creative director for Swedish pop singer Zara Larsson until he was publicly fired on March 13, 2021, after he body-shamed Larsson in private messages with Azealia Banks, calling her "Zara Armsson".

In 2020, Ripps provided creative direction and design for American rapper Pop Smoke's posthumous record Shoot for the Stars, Aim for the Moon. Controversy surrounding the album's cover artwork arose after designer Virgil Abloh received negative feedback on his design.

Art work 
Ripps's fine art practice is described as "art that uses online avenues to expose how social media can amplify narcissism and fear." He was listed in the Forbes "30 Under 30" in 2016.

In a 2014 piece titled Art Whore (stylized in all caps), the Ace Hotel in New York asked Ripps to be an artist-in-residence for one night. With a $50 budget, Ripps hired two sensual masseurs from Craigslist to draw in a hotel room, with Ripps comparing this to his own exploitation as an artist. The project sparked outcry, principally online, "for what they saw as blatant exploitation of women in the sex industry" even though one of the erotic masseurs was male. Critic Paddy Johnson declared it one of the most offensive exhibitions of the year and Rhizome described it as "unthinking, unethical, and dull", but also that "Ripps acted in a way that was ethically unsound: It reinforced and did not interrogate inequitable power relationships." In an interview, Ripps admits he regretted the title he chose.

Ripps' first solo exhibition took place in January 2015 at Postmasters Gallery in New York City, titled Ho. It featured large-scale oil painted portraits of digitally manipulated images from the Instagram account of model Adrianne Ho. The show "engages with the ways in which we portray women, tapping into the long history of the manipulation of images in the name of sex and advertisement." However, reception was varied, with Sandra Song writing for Jezebel that "his series is a visceral, knee-jerk way of removing and distorting a vision of female empowerment", and also notes the title of the show is a double entendre, as "ho" is slang for prostitute.

In 2016, Ripps exhibited Barbara Lee, an ode to the representative in Congress featuring 50,000 images downloaded from the internet covering a maquette of the Twin Towers at Steve Turner Gallery, Los Angeles.

In May 2017, Ripps premiered a small installation at the Venice Biennale titled Diventare Schiavo (Become a Slave) and featuring VR works, where the public was invited to virtually pack boxes. Freire Barnes of The Culture Trip remarked: "Here, laborious task becomes spectacle, while critiquing the socio-economic hierarchies of such technology."

In 2018, Ripps, in collaboration with photographer Maggie West, exhibited Pornhub Nation, a large interactive installation sponsored by Pornhub. The exhibition depicts a future history of the porn site's own government. It provided parodied solutions to the topics of climate change, military occupation, governmental surveillance, and space exploration.

In January 2021, Ripps claimed authorship of the Central Intelligence Agency's redesigned logo. On January 5, a CIA spokesperson denied his involvement in the redesign. In an interview with GQ, who described him as an "art prankster", Ripps explained that "[s]ocial online platforms are games that are played within the attention economy—authorship and sincerity are murky..."

Non-fungible tokens 
Ripps has used non-fungible tokens (NFTs) in his practice of conceptual art. In July 2021, he received a DMCA takedown notice from Larva Labs, the parent company of CryptoPunks, after selling a near-identical version of an official image from the project.

Yuga Labs, Inc. v. Ryder Ripps, Jeremy Cahen, and John Does 1–10 

In June 2022, a lawsuit against him was filed in U.S. federal court by Yuga Labs, the parent company of Bored Ape Yacht Club, over his RR/BAYC project. The suit accuses him of false advertising and trademark infringement, with Yuga Labs seeking financial damages. Yuga Labs believe that Ripps is organizing a "calculated, intentional, and willful" campaign to damage the reputation of Bored Ape Yacht Club. In a statement, Ripps called RR/BAYC "a protest against and a parody of" Bored Ape Yacht Club and argued that purchasers of his NFTs were informed that RR/BAYC is not affiliated with the official Bored Ape Yacht Club project or Yuga Labs. On August 15, 2022, he filed an anti-SLAPP motion to dismiss the lawsuit; it was denied by California judge John F. Walter in December of the same year.

Walter wrote that Ripps's NFTs did not advance "any idea or point of view" and were therefore disqualified from free speech protection under anti-SLAPP legislation. Ripps and Cahen jointly appealed this decision to the United States Court of Appeals for the Ninth Circuit on December 22, 2022; filing their brief on February 21, 2023.

Solo exhibitions 
 2015 - Ho, Postmasters, New York
 2015 - Alone Together, Red Bull Studios, New York
 2016 - Barbara Lee, Steve Turner, Los Angeles
 2017 - Diventare Schiavo (Become a Slave), Zuecca Projects, Venice Italy

Personal life 
In February 2021, Ripps and American rapper Azealia Banks announced their engagement. They made an audio sex tape and sold it using non-fungible token (NFT), which was then up for resale for $260 million. By March, Banks announced they had split up.

See also 
 Post-Internet

References

External links 
 
 OKFocus site

1986 births
Living people
21st-century American Jews
American conceptual artists
Artists from New York City
Creative directors
Jewish American artists
The New School alumni